The Spokane Flyers were a senior ice hockey team based in Spokane, Washington. They played in the Western International Hockey League (WIHL) from the 1948–49 season to the 1979–80 season. 

The Flyers were the 1949–50 United States senior champions, and won the Allan Cup as the senior champions of Canada in 1976 and 1980.

References

Edmonton Oilers minor league affiliates
Ice hockey teams in Washington (state)
Sports in Spokane, Washington
Defunct ice hockey teams in the United States
Western International Hockey League teams

de:Spokane Flyers